Sangam is a Hindi language Indian soap opera that was broadcast on STAR Plus. The series premiered on 20 August 2007 and ended on 6 March 2009. It stars Jennifer Winget as Ganga and Chaitanya Choudhury as Sagar, who both fall in love when they first meet in a small town of "Kundanpur".

Overview
Sangam is the story of Allahabad based young girl named Ganga, who is ambitious and believes in following her father's dreams and giving the best to her family. Her parents are her support pillars who unconditionally under any circumstance stand by her and her dreams and she moves ahead to fulfill them. But life makes her put the interests of others before her own aspirations and she emerges heroic. Her father dies and the villain marries Ganga. The character's role is very subdued in the fact that the series focuses on her quite a lot and takes things from her point of view. Ganga forbids having pleasure with villain but he forcefully gets her in the bedroom along with  his friends and he uses her for earning money..

It was about ganga and her love with sagar, and how destiny tries to unite them again and again after they keep getting separated. it was based on true love and passion and how there was a sangam between sagar and ganga. ganga was a village girl while sagar was a big business man. After many complications sagar and ganga end up getting married.

Cast
 Jennifer Winget as Ganga Shukla / Janvi Khurana
 Chaitanya Choudhury as Sagar Bhatia / Sunny
 Shaleen Bhanot as Madanlal
 Sangita Patel as Muhasvati Bhatia
 Shishir Sharma as Dinanath Shukla
 Khushi Dubey as Ganga Bhatia, Sagar and Kaveri's daughter
 Akshat Gupta as Rahul Mehra (2008)
 Nidhi Seth as Kaveri Shukla, Ganga's sister (2007-2008)
 Madhura as Kaveri Shukla, Ganga's sister (2008-2009)
 Lavina Tandon as Anjali Bhatia, Shekhar's daughter
 Savita Prabhune as Rahul's mother
 Abir Goswami as Subodh, Shekhar and Sagar's brother-in-law
 Geetanjali Mishra as Shanta, Subodh's wife, Shekhar and Sagar's sister
 Gagan Malik as Rahul Mehra (2008-2009)
 Neelu Kohli as Rano Bua

References

External links
Sangam Official Site on STAR Plus

2007 Indian television series debuts
2009 Indian television series endings
Indian television series
StarPlus original programming
Television series by 20th Century Fox Television
Television shows set in Uttar Pradesh